The RN154 is a trunk road (nationale) in France linking Val-de-Reuil (near Rouen) and Artenay (near Orléans).  A substantial portion of the road has been designated part of the outer Paris ring-road (premier cas/first - inner - solution), leading to an increase in traffic volumes.   Partly because of this, the road has been or is being upgraded to dual carriageway for much of its length.

Upgraded sections

 Val-de-Reuil-La Madeleine-de-Nonancourt
 La Madeleine-de-Nonancourt-Dreux, (Route nationale 12) under construction
 Dreux bypass, under construction
 Dreux-Chartres, under construction
 Chartres bypass, projected
 Chartres-Artenay, projected

Route

Val-de-Reuil to Dreux

 Val-de-Reuil
 Louviers
 Pinterville
 Évreux
 Prey
 Chavigny-Bailleul
 La Madeleine-de-Nonancourt

Between La Madeleine-de-Nonancourt and Dreux, the road is called Route nationale 12

Dreux to Chartres

 Dreux
 Marville-Moutiers-Brûlé
 Le Boullay-Mivoye
 Serazereux
 Challet
 Poisvilliers
 Chartres

Chartres to Artenay

 Gellainville
 Berchères-les-Pierres
 Allonnes
 Ymonville
 Allaines-Mervilliers
 Artenay

External links
  Work progress on the DDE website

154
Transport in Normandy